is a town located on Yoronjima, in Ōshima District, Kagoshima Prefecture, Japan.

As of June 2013, the town has an estimated population of 5,263 and a population density of 257 persons per km². The total area is 20.49  km². Much of the island is within the boundaries of the Amami Guntō National Park.

Geography
Yoron occupies the entire island of Yoronjima, in the Amami archipelago of the Satsunan Islands, and administratively borders Okinawa Prefecture.

Climate
The climate is classified as humid subtropical (Köppen climate classification Cfa) with very warm summers and mild winters. Precipitation is high throughout the year, but is highest in the months of May, June and September. The area is subject to frequent typhoons.

History
On April 1, 1908, Yoronshima was administratively divided into six villages. From February 28, 1946 until December 25, 1953, Yoronshima, along with the other Amami Islands, was administered by the United States. The six villages were merged to form the town of Yoron on January 1, 1963. Proposals to merge Yoronshima with China and Wadomari on the neighboring island of Okinoerabujima in 2003 were overwhelmingly rejected by voters on both islands.

Transportation
Yoron Airport (IATA: RNJ; ICAO: RORY) serves travellers to and from the island. Japan Air Commuter flies to Kagoshima and Okinoerabu Airports, and Ryukyu Air Commuter provides service to Naha Airport.

There is a regular ferry service from Yoron Port to Kagoshima, Kobe, Okinawa, and the surrounding Amami Islands.

Education
Kagoshima Prefecture operates .

The municipality's Yoron Town Board of Education operates Yoron Junior High School (JA) and three elementary schools: Chahana (茶花小学校), Nama (JA), and Yoron (与論小学校).

Sister city relations
 – Mykonos, Greece, since 1985

References

External links

 
Official website 

Towns in Kagoshima Prefecture
Populated coastal places in Japan